The Battle of Gavinana was a battle in the War of the League of Cognac. It was fought on 3 August 1530 between the city of Florence and the army of the Holy Roman Empire.

History 
The Imperial forces were led by Philibert of Châlon, Prince of Orange, with reinforcements under Fabrizio Maramaldo arriving later in the battle.  The Florentine forces were led by the florentine commissary Francesco Ferruccio.

At first the Florentines drove back the Imperial army, despite being outnumbered. In the process, the Prince of Orange was fatally shot in the chest by two arquebus balls.

However, when Maramaldo arrived with 2,000 troops the tide was reversed. After being wounded and captured, Ferruccio was executed personally by Maramaldo. Ferruccio's last response to his murderer, tu uccidi un uomo morto (you are killing a dead man) led him to long lasting fame and to become one of the major icons of the Italian risorgimento. In contrast, Maramaldo's behavior, echoed by several historical reports, gave his name a shameful reputation, and in modern Italian maramaldo means cowardly murderer.

References

External links
 Battle of Gavinana on World History Database

Gavinana
1530 in the Republic of Florence
Gavinana
Gavinana
Gavinana
1530 in Italy